Rail Land Development Authority (RLDA) is a statutory authority, under the Indian Ministry of Railways, set-up by an Amendment to the Railways Act, 1989. It is responsible for creating assets for Indian Railways through the development of vacant railway land for commercial use to generate revenue by non-tariff measures. RLDA's mission is to be a leader in creating value through the redevelopment of land and air spaces – residential, commercial, and transportation hubs. RLDA's expenses are covered through grants provided by Indian Railways. RLDA transfers the total earnings generated from the development of railway land to Indian Railways. The Indian Planning Commission has computed an approximate budget of around Rs 20 to 272 billion for the development of infrastructure nationally during the 11th plan period. Out of this budget, the Railways has an anticipated requirement of Rs 2800 billion. 83% of this requirement is supposed to be met through public sector investment. In order to generate the remaining investment required to meet the budget mentioned above, the Indian Railways set up the Rail Land Development Authority on 1 November 2006. Ved Prakash Dudeja, a 1986 batch IRSE officer, is Vice Chairman of RLDA. He joined RLDA on 7 April 2019.

Currently, RLDA is working on four types of projects:

 Commercial Projects
 Multi-functional Complex
 Colony Redevelopment
 Station development

Purpose
Indian Railways own approximately 43,000 hectares of vacant land. The land which is not required for operational purposes in the foreseeable future will be identified by the zonal railways and the details will be advised to the Railway Board. Such plots of land would then be handed over to the RLDA by the Railway Board in phases for commercial development.

RLDA's Business Model 

By monetization of land parcels, Railways will be earning 100% non-tariff earnings at no cost either by getting Upfront Lease Premium or by asset formation in the form of Railway Colonies/Railway Stations. By the development of Railway Stations/MFCs, better facilities are being provided to Railway Passengers without any investment on the part of Railway.

Initially, RLDA was entrusted with 23 Railway Colonies in 2018 with the purpose to re-develop these depilated Railway colonies which were mostly single or double storied and covering huge areas, thus, there was poor utilization of FSI/FAR available for that particular land area. RLDA has already finalized various Architects for Feasibility/Do-ability study. Railway Colonies will be developed by efficient utilization of FSI/FAR. Thus, creating a Railway Colony in one small pocket of land, while freeing the rest of the land for monetization. This land can be leased out to a possible developer, functioning as potential earning to Railways in the form of Upfront Lease Premium, as well as the Development of Railway Colonies without any investment on the part of Railways.

Recently, 61 more Railway Colonies have been entrusted to RLDA for Development on the same model. Approximately 25000 Staff Quarters will be re-constructed.

A total of 123 MFCs were entrusted to RLDA for development. Out of these, 52 MFCs has been leased out for a lease period of 45 years to various developers PAN India for developing multiple facilities like shopping, food stalls/restaurants, Book Stalls, ATMs, Medicines and Budget Hotels, Parking Spaces and other similar amenities for rail users at Railway Stations. Total revenue generation is approximately Rs. 500 Cr. which is the earnings of Railways. Out of the total 123 MFCs entrusted 33 MFCs have been advised to Railway Board for deferring and for approximately 13 MFCs alternative sites are being suggested by Railways and approximate tenders for 19 MFCs will be called shortly.

Commercial / Residential Sites

A total of 21 Commercial Sites leased out for 45/99 years to various Developers with Realized/Expected revenue of approximately Rs. 1700 crores for Railways. Upfront lease premium model through transparent E-bidding system is adopted. Approximately 55 more sites having an approximate value of Rs. 7500 crores available for lease PAN India.

Some major Commercial sites which have been leased out are as follows:-

 Ashok Vihar – The total earnings to Railways is Rs. 1359 Cr. against a reserve price of Rs. 1280 Crore. This is the major achievement of RLDA in the Current Year and the land use of this site is "residential" and selected Developer M/s Godrej Properties will be developing this property for Smart and Healthy Living Places catering to a demand of mid and premium segment housing.
 Other Major sites which have been leased out are Padi (Chennai) for a leased value of Rs. 43.0 Cr., Hazari Bagh (Ajmer) for a leased value of Rs. 47.88 Cr., Aish Bagh (Lucknow) for a leased value of Rs. 57.67 Cr., Gwaltoli (Kanpur) for a leased value of Rs. 66.70 Cr. Jhansi (E) for a leased value of Rs. 30.66 Cr., Ayanavaram Part C for Rs 28 Cr, Amritsar Fo a lease Period of Rs. 15.07Cr etc.

 Re-Development of Railway Colonies

 At present 84 Railway Colonies entrusted to RLDA for Re-development.
 Approximately 25000 Staff Quarters to be Re-Constructed
 Efficient Utilization of FSI/FAR to generate space.
 The entire cost to be met by leveraging commercial development of released Railway Land/Airspace
 Upfront Lease Premium Model + Re-development of Railway Quarters
Re-development of Railway Stations

  A total of 51 Railway Stations in PAN India are being re-developed by RLDA on PPP Model, on Self Sustainable Model in synergy with Smart City Projects launched by Government of India. Entire cost of re-development to be met by leveraging commercial development of spare railway land/airspace in and around the station.

Multi-Functional Complex (MFC) Sites

  A total of 52 MFCs leased out for 45 years to various developers
 Revenue generation of approximately Rs. 500 Crore to Railways 
 MFCs provide multiple facilities like shopping, food stalls/restaurants, Book stalls, ATMs, Medicines and Budget Hotels, parking spaces and other similar amenities for rail users at Railway Stations

Details of leased out RLDA's commercial sites

Financial Year 2019 – 2020

Financial year 2018-19

Financial year 2017 – 2018

Milestones achieved 

 RLDA has broken all previous records of earnings as well as those of awarding of lease contracts in 2019-20. 
 RLDA has awarded tenders for long lease of land parcels worth Rs 1550 crores during the year which is its highest ever performance so far. 
 Total Earning of RLDA during the year 2019-20 has been Rs 931 crores as against Rs 31 CR, 18 CR, 43 CR and 83 CR in the previous four years.

References

External links
 

2006 establishments in India
Government agencies established in 2006
Ministry of Railways (India)
Land development companies
Land management in India